This is a list of seasons of the United States Hockey League since its transition to a junior hockey league in 1979.

Junior league
Starting in 1979–80, the USHL changed to an all-junior league and would operate as an American competitor to the Canadian Hockey League. While the CHL is the major junior program for most professional hockey prospects, its players are forbidden by NCAA regulations to play hockey for Division I or III programs, making the USHL a favorite preparatory league for players seeking to play collegiate hockey in America.

References